Flavobacterium brevivitae  is a Gram-negative, strictly aerobic and motile bacterium from the genus of Flavobacterium which has been isolated from water from the Caohu River in Taiwan.

References

External links
Type strain of Flavobacterium brevivitae at BacDive -  the Bacterial Diversity Metadatabase

 

brevivitae
Bacteria described in 2016